South Toowoomba is an urban locality in Toowoomba in the Toowoomba Region, Queensland, Australia.

Geography
South Toowoomba is located immediately south of the Toowoomba city centre.

History
Giabal is an Australian Aboriginal language. The Giabal (Paiamba, Gomaingguru) language region includes the landscape within the local government boundaries of the Toowoomba Regional Council, particularly Toowoomba south to Allora and west to Millmerran.

St Patrick's Catholic Primary School opened in 1863 at St Patrick's Catholic Church with lay teachers but from 1873 was operated by the Sisters of Mercy. St Patrick's Secondary School for Girls opened in 1914 and was renamed The Cathedral School in 1938. In 1959 the two schools were renamed  St Saviour's Primary School and St Saviour's Secondary School. Subsequently the secondary school was renamed St Saviour's College. From 1989 the secondary school came under lay administration. In 1994 the primary school also came under lay administration.

Toowoomba South State School opened in 1865. It was divided into Toowoomba South Girls and Infants School and Toowoomba South Boys School in 1869. On 1 April 1878 the Girls and Infants School split into Toowoomba Middle Girls State School and Toowoomba Middle Infants State School, but on 1 March 1880 they were merged to create Toowoomba Middle Girls and Infants State School. On 22 January 1883 the school was split again into Toowoomba South Girls State School and Toowoomba South Infants State School, being merged back on 1 October 1900 into Toowoomba South Girls and Infants School. In 1983 the Girls and Infants School and the Boys School  were merged to re-establish Toowoomba South State School. The school closed on 31 December 2013. Over the many years and the splits/mergers, the physical footprint of the school (as a whole) has changed. At its commencement, the school was on the north-east corner of Ruthven Street and Lawrence Street, later expanding through James Street. At its closure, the school was at 158 James Street. During much of its history, the school also occupied 152 James Street (corner of Neil Street) during much of its history. This series of maps shows some of the changes. The school's website was archived.

Special education ("opportunity classes") commenced at Toowoomba South State School in 1923. On 26 January 1960, these classes moved to the new Toowoomba Opportunity School (later Toowoomba Special School) in Centenary Heights.

Heritage listings 
South Toowoomba has a number of heritage-listed sites, including:
 James Street: St Patricks Cathedral
 158 James Street: Toowoomba South State School
 Pechey Street: Toowoomba Hospital
 68 Stephen Street: Cottage

Education 
St Saviour's Primary School is a Catholic primary (Prep-6) school for boys and girls at 14 Lawrence Street (. In 2017, the school had an enrolment of 409 students with 25 teachers (21 full-time equivalent) and 19 non-teaching staff (9 full-time equivalent).

St Saviour's College is a Catholic secondary (7-12) school for girls at Neil Street. In 2017, the school had an enrolment of 158 students with 24 teachers (21 full-time equivalent) and 15 non-teaching staff (11 full-time equivalent).

The University of Queensland Medical School is located at Toowoomba Hospital.

Attractions 

 St Patricks Catholic Cathedral
 Downs Shopping Centre
City Colf Club - Venue for local entertainment and host of the Coca-Cola Queensland PGA Championship
 Toowoomba Public Hospital
 Lake Annand

References

External links 

 

 
Suburbs of Toowoomba
Localities in Queensland